The Women's National Football League (Mongolian: Эмэгтэйчүүдийн Үндэсний Лиг) is the top-flight women's football league in Mongolia.

History
In an effort to organize a women's national team for Mongolia, the Mongolian Football Federation (MFF) signed a memorandum of agreement with their Japanese counterparts. To encourage participation of Mongolian women in football, the MFF organized the first edition of the Women's National Football League tournament in July 2015.

The first season which ran from 21 to 29 July 2015 was contested by eight teams. Khad FC was the winner of the inaugural edition which won over all the other seven teams in the competition. The club scored 22 goals and conceded two goals during the whole season. Mongoliin Temuulel FC won the silver medal.

Arvis F.C. were the winners of the second season which was held in 2016. They won again in the third edition which was contested by nine clubs around mid-2017. Deren FC and Mongolian Temuulen were the second and third placers respectively. 

In 2020, the International Federation of Association Football (FIFA) provided $500,000 USD to the team to help grow its leagues.

Winners
As of 2022 season.

Championships by club 
As of 2022 season

See also
 AFC Women's Club Championship

References

Mongolia
2015 establishments in Mongolia
Sports leagues established in 2015
Football leagues in Mongolia